Giacomo Moschini (1896–1943) was an Italian film actor.

Selected filmography
 Rails (1929)
 The Charmer (1931)
 Resurrection (1931)
 Paradise (1932)
 Unjustified Absence (1939)
 The Document (1939)
 The King's Jester (1941)
 Honeymoon (1941)
 The Hero of Venice (1941)
 The Betrothed (1941)
 The Countess of Castiglione (1942)
 Malombra (1942)
 Rossini (1942)
 La signorina (1942)
 Annabella's Adventure (1943)
 Short Circuit (1943)
 Back Then (1943)

References

Bibliography
 Verdone, Luca. I film di Alessandro Blasetti. Gremese Editore, 1989.

External links

1896 births
1943 deaths
Italian male film actors
Actors from Padua